The Rev Matthew Murray FRSE (1735-1791) was an 18th-century Scottish minister and Fellow of the Royal Society of Edinburgh.

Life
He was born in North Berwick in 1735 the son of Rev George Murray and his wife Anna Reid.

He was licensed to preach in 1756. He originally preached in Haddington but in 1758 he replaced his father in his home town of North Berwick, remaining there for the rest of his life.

In 1784 he was elected a Fellow of the Royal Society of Edinburgh. His proposers were William Robertson, Alexander Carlyle, and Henry Grieve.

He died in North Berwick on 13 August 1791.

Family
In 1772 he married Anne Hill (d.1803) sister of Rev George Hill.

Their children included Rev George Murray and Hugh Murray.

References

18th-century Ministers of the Church of Scotland
Fellows of the Royal Society of Edinburgh
1735 births
1791 deaths
People from North Berwick